Tosu or tOSU may refer to:

Cities
 Tosu, Russia, a selo (village) in Vilyuysky District, Sakha Republic
 Tosu, Saga, a city in Japan
 Sagan Tosu, an association football club in Tosu, Saga
 Shin-Tosu Station, a railway station in Tosu, Saga
 Tosu Futures, a former football club in Tosu, Saga
 Tosu Stadium, a football stadium in Tosu, Saga
 Tosu Station, a railway station in Tosu, Saga
 Tosu language, in the Qiangic and Tibeto-Burman language groups
 Toșu, a Romanian surname

Universities
 Ohio State University

See also